The Tortue River is a river in the Côte-Nord administrative region, in the province of Quebec, Canada. The course of this river successively crosses the RCM of:
 Sept-Rivières Regional County Municipality: in unorganized territory of Rivière-Nipissis;
 Minganie Regional County Municipality: in unorganized territory of Lac-Jérôme, then the municipality of Rivière-au-Tonnerre.

It flows into the Gulf of Saint Lawrence.

The southern part of the Tortue River watershed is served by the route 138 which runs along the north shore of the estuary of Saint Lawrence.

Location
The river originates from Turtle Lake (length:  octopus-shaped;). This lake has an island in its center-north. It is fed mainly by: (clockwise) the discharge of a small lake, the discharge (coming from the west) of a group of lakes, the discharge (coming from the north) of a lake, a stream (coming from the north), the discharge (coming from the northeast) of a set of lakes, the discharge (coming from the east) of some lakes.

The river flows more or less in parallel to the west of the Manitou River and to the east of the Bouleau River.

Upper course of the Turtle River (segment of )

  first to the south, crossing a lake, then to the southwest; finally, to the south, crossing Lake Eliniore to the south-east, to its mouth;
  towards the south-east in a deep valley and down the mountain, forming a hook towards the south at the end of the segment, to the confluence of the rivière aux Îlets (coming from the west);

Lower course of the Turtle River (segment of )

  first south, curving east, until a bend in the river, corresponding to a stream (coming from the northeast);
  first to the south, then to the southeast, to a bend in the river (corresponding to a stream (coming from the east), then to the west, to the confluence of the rivière aux Chutes (coming from the west);
  towards the south-west, forming a few streamers, until the confluence of the Petite rivière Tortue (coming from the north-west);

Lower course of the Turtle River (segment of )

  towards the south-east, forming a few coils and collecting the discharge (coming from the west) of Lake Fabien, up to the Philippe-Henley stream (coming from the north-east);
  towards the southeast, collecting five streams on the northeast side and passing under the route 138 bridge, up to its mouth.

The mouth of the Tortue River is in the municipality of Rivière-au-Tonnerre in the Minganie Regional County Municipality.
A painted metal bridge carries Quebec Route 138 over the river nears its mouth.

Toponymy
The origin of the name is unknown. It was made official on 5 December 1968.
The names of local European settlers are reflected in Moïse Maher Lake, located between the Manitou River and the Tortue River, and in the Ruisseau Philippe Henley, a tributary of the Tortue river.

Basin

Part of the river basin is in the unorganized territories of Rivière-Nipissis and Lac-Jérôme and part in the municipality of Rivière-au-Tonnerre.
It lies between the basins of the Sault Plat River to the west and the Manitou River to the east.
A map of the ecological regions of Quebec shows the river basin in sub-regions 6j-T and 6m-T of the east spruce/moss subdomain.

Notes

Sources

Rivers of Côte-Nord